The Library Freedom Project teaches librarians about surveillance threats, privacy rights, and digital tools to thwart surveillance. In 2015 the Project began an endeavour to place relays and, particularly, exit nodes of the Tor anonymity network in public libraries.

Tor Exit Relay Project
Its pilot project enabled the Kilton Public Library in Lebanon, New Hampshire to become in July 2015 the first library in the United States to host Tor, running a middle relay on its excess bandwidth. This service was put on hold in early September, however, when the library was visited by the local police department after they had received a "heads up" e-mail from Department of Homeland Security highlighting the criminal uses of the Tor network (and which falsely claimed that this was the network's primary usage), whereupon the library began reconsidering the deployment from a public relations perspective.

After an outpouring of support from the Electronic Frontier Foundation, the Massachusetts and New Hampshire affiliates of the ACLU, the Tor Project itself, an editorial in the local paper Valley News strongly in favor of the pilot project, and virtually unanimous public testimony, the library board of trustees decided on 15 September 2015 to renew the anonymity service, letting stand its previous unanimous vote to establish the middle relay. A dozen libraries and their supporters nationwide expressed interest hosting their own nodes after the DHS involvement became public (an example of the Streisand effect), and U.S. Rep. Zoe Lofgren (D-Calif) released a letter on 10 December 2015, in which she asked the DHS to clarify its procedures, stating that “While the Kilton Public Library’s board ultimately voted to restore their Tor relay, I am no less disturbed by the possibility that DHS employers are pressuring or persuading public and private entities to discontinue or degrade services that protect the privacy and anonymity of U.S. citizens.”

In March 2016, New Hampshire state representative Keith Ammon introduced a bill allowing public libraries to run privacy software such as Tor which specifically referenced Tor itself. The bill was crafted with extensive input from Library Freedom director Alison Macrina, and was the direct result of the Kilton Public Library imbroglio. The bill was passed by the House 268-62.

Also in March 2016, the first Tor middle relay at a library in Canada was established, at the University of Western Ontario. Given that the running of a Tor exit node is an unsettled area of Canadian law, and that institutions are more capable than individuals to cope with legal pressures, Alison Macrina has opined that in some ways she would like to see intelligence agencies and law enforcement attempt to intervene in the event that an exit node were established.

Also in March 2016, the Library Freedom Project was awarded the Free Software Foundation's 2015 
Free Software Award for Projects of Social Benefit at MIT.

As of 26 June 2016, the Kilton Library is the only library in the U.S. running a Tor exit node. However, in August of that same year, Kilton Library's IT Manager, Chuck McAndrew, said they still hoped other libraries would run their own, adding, "We always planned on our library simply being the pilot for a larger nationwide program. Like everything, this will take time. We continue to talk to other libraries, and the Library Freedom Project is actively working with a number of libraries that have an interest in participating."

Workshops 
 Working with ACLU affiliates across the United States, the Library Freedom Project provides workshops to educate librarians about "some of the major surveillance programs and authorizations, including the USA PATRIOT Act, section 702 of the FISA Amendments Act, PRISM, XKEYSCORE, and more, connecting the NSA’s dragnet with FBI and local police surveillance".  They also discuss current and developing privacy law on both the federal and state levels, in addition to advising librarians how to handle issues like gag orders and National Security Letters.  Other topics covered include Privacy Enhancing Technology (PET) that might help library patrons browse anonymously or evade online tracking.

Furthermore, the project conducts training classes for library patrons themselves which focus on on-line security and privacy.  The classes can be adjusted to accommodate any level of user, from beginner to advanced, and various security needs. Given that library patrons, including but not limited to domestic violence survivors, political activists, whistle blowers, journalists, and LGBT teens or adults in many communities, face various threat models, the gestalt of digital security is not a matter of one-size-fits-all. In this regard Alison Macrina has remarked at a library conference that " “Digital security isn’t about which tools you use; rather, it’s about understanding the threats you face and how you can counter those threats. To become more secure, you must determine what you need to protect, and whom you need to protect it from. Threats can change depending on where you’re located, what you’re doing, and whom you’re working with.”

The Library Freedom Project is a member of the torservers.net network, an organization of nonprofits which specializes in the general establishment of exit nodes via workshops and donations.

Library Freedom Institute 
Beginning in 2018, Library Freedom Project began offering the Library Freedom Institute as a joint partnership with New York University. The institute is "a free, privacy-focused... program for librarians to teach them the skills necessary to thrive as Privacy Advocates; from educating community members to influencing public policy." The format of the Institute has changed slightly with each cohort, but lasts four to six months and features lecturers and discussions in the areas of technology, community building, media, activism, and education. Participants create capstone projects at the end of the course. Since its inception, the Library Freedom Institute has been supported by grants from the Institute of Museum and Library Services.

As of July 2020, there have been four cohorts of Library Freedom Institute with over 100 graduates from the program.

Funding 
In January 2015 the Library Freedom Project received $244,700 in grant funding from the Knight Foundation, and in January 2016 $50,000 from the Rose Foundation's Consumer Privacy Rights Fund (the fiscal sponsor of that grant being the Miami Foundation).

In August 2017 the Library Freedom Project was awarded a $249,504 grant from the Laura Bush 21st Century Librarian Program to facilitate the use of practical privacy tools in libraries using a "training the trainers" model. 40 geographically dispersed Privacy Advocates are expected to be trained in a six month course. New York University (NYU) and the Library Freedom Project have since created a formal collaborative program funded by the Institute of Museum and Library Services called Library Freedom Institute; its inaugural course began in June 2018.

References

External links

An extensive interview on Law and Disorder Radio with Alison Macrina, the founder and director of the Library Freedom Project
Alison Macrina gives a presentation at the 32nd Annual Chaos Communication Congress in Hamburg, Germany in conjunction with the Tor project
A 2017 interview with Marcina on the Intercepted Podcast (at 14:22; transcript included)
Interview with the library director and IT head

Internet privacy organizations
American librarianship and human rights